Tomes's sword-nosed bat (Lonchorhina aurita), also known as the common sword-nosed bat is a bat species from South and Central America. It is also found in the Bahamas, but is known from only one specimen collected on the island of New Providence.

In 2006, the bat was rediscovered in the Santa Cruz Department of Bolivia by scientists Aideé Vargas and Kathrin Barboza Marquez. Prior to their find, it was believed that the bat had been extinct in Bolivia for 72 years. There has since been an Ecological Sanctuary established at the town of San Juan de Corralito located in the Ángel Sandoval Province to protect the species.

Description
Its ears are long with sharply-pointed tips. Its fur is dark brown or black in color, while the patagia are black. Individuals weigh .

Biology and ecology
It is insectivorous, though a record exists of one individual eating fruit. It is nocturnal, roosting in sheltered places during the day such as caves or culverts. These roosts contain 10-500 individuals in associations called colonies. Roosts are shared with bats of other species.

Range and habitat
It is found in several countries in Central and South America including: Belize, Bolivia, Brazil, Colombia, Costa Rica, Ecuador, El Salvador, French Guiana, Guatemala, Guyana, Honduras, Mexico, Nicaragua, Panama, Peru, Suriname, Trinidad and Tobago, and Venezuela.

Conservation
As of 2015, it is evaluated as a least-concern species by the IUCN.

References

Bats of South America
Bats of Brazil
Mammals of Colombia
Lonchorhina
Mammals described in 1863
Bats of Central America
Taxa named by Robert Fisher Tomes